Sarah Grappin (born 11 August 1978) is a French actress.

Selected filmography

External links 
 

Living people
1978 births
French film actresses
Actresses from Paris
20th-century French actresses
21st-century French actresses